Coverack Bridges is a hamlet in southwest Cornwall, England, United Kingdom. It is situated southwest of Wendron in the valley of the River Cober just under one mile north of Helston. The area is mainly farming now but has a long history of well over 200 years of granite quarry. The local quarry is still in business and is located just below the golf course along the banks of the River Cober.

References

External links

Hamlets in Cornwall